Karen Fischer is an American seismologist known for her research on the structure of Earth's mantle, its lithosphere, and how subduction zones change over geologic history.

Education and career 
Fischer has a B.S. in geology and geophysics from Yale University (1983). While an undergraduate, Fischer had summer research experiences at Yale University and Lamont–Doherty Geological Observatory. In 1989, she earned a Ph.D. in geophysics from the Massachusetts Institute of Technology (1989) with a dissertation titled "The morphology and dynamics of subducting lithosphere". After a postdoctoral appointment at Lamont–Doherty Earth Observatory of Columbia University (1989-1990), she joined the faculty at Brown University where she is the Louis and Elizabeth Scherck Distinguished Professor of Geological Sciences.

From 2003 to 2005 Fisher was an editor at Geochemistry, Geophysics, Geosystems (G3) and she served as the president of the Seismology section at the American Geophysical Union from 2013 to 2014.

Research 
Fischer's research uses seismology to study the interior of Earth's crust and mantle, especially in the lithosphere and the asthenosphere. In the Marquesas Islands in the Pacific Ocean, Fischer identified unusually high temperatures in the lithosphere. In the Tonga subduction zone, she used seismic data to map changes in the thickness of the subducting lithosphere and modeled flow rates within the mantle. She has identified the presence of a continuous mantle on the East Pacific Rise and discontinuities in the mantle under the eastern United States. In the Appalachian Mountains, Fischer deploys broadband seismometers in the field and uses the resulting data to define the thickness of the crust beneath the Appalachian Mountains. Her research provides insight into age-related changes in the materials beneath old mountains and discontinuities in the crust and mantle beneath the Appalachian Mountains and deformation in the plates beneath Southern California. Her research on the lithosphere in South American and Africa has implications for the stability of the tectonic plates in the region.

In 2019 she was received the Harry Fielding Reid Medal from the Seismological Society of America for "pioneering research on Earth’s upper mantle structure and dynamics, the structure and evolution of continental lithosphere, and the dynamics of subduction systems".

Awards 

 Royce Family Professorship, excellence in teaching, Brown University (2004-2004)
Fellow, American Geophysical Union (2010)
Beno Gutenberg Lecture, American Geophysical Union (2016)
NASA EarthScope lecturer (2017-2018)
 Harry Fielding Medal, Seismological Society of America (2019)

References

External links 
 

Fellows of the American Geophysical Union
Seismologists
Yale College alumni
Massachusetts Institute of Technology alumni
Brown University faculty
1961 births
Living people